Edward Randolph (~October 1690 – after 1756), sometimes referred to as Edward Randolph of Bremo, was a ship captain, a London tobacco merchant, and the seventh and youngest son of William Randolph and Mary Isham.

Biography
In 1713, Randolph inherited 625 acres of land near the Chickahominy River when his father's will was probated at the Henrico County court in Varina, Virginia. Although known as "Edward Randolph of Bremo", the Virginia Historical Society reported that the Bremo Plantation located along the James River in Henrico County near Malvern Hill and Turkey Island was actually owned by the Cocke family of Virginia during the 18th century. Randolph "chose a seafaring life" and operated merchant vessels between England and the Colony of Virginia. Residing in England, he met an heiress named "Elizabeth" (whose last name has been noted as "Graves", "Groves", and "Grosvenor") from Bristol, England at a launch at Gravesend, Kent. The couple married around 1715 and had four children:
Joseph Randolph did not marry.
Edward Randolph (? – April 1757) married Lucy Harrison of Berkeley (the daughter of Benjamin Harrison IV, the sister of Benjamin Harrison V, the sister-in-law of Peyton Randolph and William Randolph III, and the granddaughter of Robert "King" Carter) in the late 1740s and had two children. Harrison's sisters were married to Peyton Randolph and William Randolph III, Edward Randolph Jr's cousins.
Elizabeth Randolph first married Reverend William Yates, the fifth president of The College of William & Mary, and had three children. She then married Theodorick Bland of Cawsons.
Mary Randolph married Robert Yates, the brother of William Yates, and had three children.

Two sons of Bartholomew Yates, William and Robert, were members of the Church of England and married the two daughters of Randolph, Elizabeth and Mary, while visiting England to obtain their clerical orders.

Although he came from a large, wealthy, and powerful family, Edward Randolph's children were born into a branch that was not very prosperous. Randolph was bankrupt by 1732 and misfortune had later brought him near poverty. Benjamin Harrison IV was among his many creditors and brought suit against him in 1737.

It is not known where or when Randolph died, but was placed in Virginia as late as 1756 by the Dinwiddie Papers.

Ancestry and descendants

In addition to the familial connections noted previously, Randolph was a great-great-great grandfather of Harrison Randolph, the President and Professor of Mathematics at the College of Charleston. He was also a great-uncle of United States President Thomas Jefferson.

See also
First Families of Virginia
Randolph family of Virginia

Notes

References

1690 births
Date of death unknown
People from Henrico County, Virginia
Edward